Head First or Headfirst may refer to:

Music 
 Head First (The Babys album) (1979)
 Head First (Badfinger album) (recorded 1974, released 2000)
 Head First (Goldfrapp album) (2010), or its title track
 Head First (Uriah Heep album) (1983)
 "Head First", a song by Aerosmith from the Get a Grip sessions

Other Media 
 Head First (book series), a series of books on computer programming by Kathy Sierra and Bert Bates
 HeadFirst PD, a library of public-domain software
 Headfirst Productions, a defunct UK video game studio
Head First (TV series), Australian 2010s TV documentary series
 "Head First", an episode of the sitcom The King of Queens
 Headfirst (La Tête la première), a 2012 Belgian film starring Alice de Lencquesaing

Linguistics 
 Head-first, a property whereby a word comes before the words that modify it